The 1968 USC Trojans football team represented the University of Southern California (USC) in the 1968 NCAA University Division football season. In their ninth year under head coach John McKay, the Trojans compiled a 9–1–1 record (6–0 against conference opponents), won the Pacific-8 Conference (Pac-8) championship, and outscored their opponents by a combined total of 259 to 168. The team was ranked #2 in the final Coaches Poll and #4 in the final AP Poll.

Steve Sogge led the team in passing, completing 122 of 207 passes for 1,454 yards with nine touchdowns and nine interceptions. O. J. Simpson led the team in rushing with 383 carries for 1,880 yards and 23 touchdowns. Jim Lawrence led the team in receiving with 26 catches for 386 yards and two touchdowns. Simpson won both the Heisman Trophy and the Walter Camp Award.

Schedule

Roster

Rankings

Game summaries

Minnesota
OJ Simpson 39 rushes, 236 yards

Miami (FL)

Stanford
O.J. Simpson 47 rushes, 220 yards

Oregon State
O.J. Simpson 47 rushes, 238 yards

Notre Dame

vs. Ohio State (Rose Bowl)

Awards and honors
O. J. Simpson, Heisman Trophy
O. J. Simpson, Walter Camp Award

1969 NFL/AFL Draft
Eight Trojans were selected in the 1969 NFL/AFL draft, held in late January.

References

USC
USC Trojans football seasons
Pac-12 Conference football champion seasons
USC Trojans football